Abantis zambesiaca, the Zambezi paradise skipper, is a butterfly in the family Hesperiidae. It is found in western and southern Tanzania, the Democratic Republic of Congo (Shaba), Zambia, Malawi, Namibia (Caprivi), Mozambique and Zimbabwe. The habitat consists of savanna and Brachystegia woodland.

Adults are attracted to flowers and adult males mud-puddle. Adults are on wing from August to November and from February to May.

The larvae feed on Pericopsis angolensis and Swartzia madagascariensis.

References

Butterflies described in 1874
Tagiadini
Butterflies of Africa